Linux Australia is the national, Australian  Free and Open Source Software Community organisation. It was founded in 1997 and formally incorporated in New South Wales as a non-profit organisation in 1999. Linux Australia aims to represent Australian Free and Open Source Software communities and to support and collaborate with related groups, including Linux User Groups in Australia.

History and goals 
Linux Australia was co-founded by Terry Dawson and Gary Allpike. From humble beginnings the organisation was formally incorporated to provide legal support for the inaugural Conference of Australian Linux Users (now linux.conf.au). Over progressive years the organisation has steadily matured in its operation and today its major activities include the successful annual linux.conf.au open source conference, a grants program that seeds and supports relevant open source projects, and regular participation in public events such as conferences and exhibitions. Public relations activities include lobbying to government and corporate entities on open source issues and comment and opinion to the media.

Office holders 
The executive council is elected democratically by the organisation membership annually, and therefore changes year to year. Membership is open to anyone with an interest in furthering the goals and objectives of the organisation.

Presidents 
 Terry Dawson 2001
 Anand Kumria 2002
 Pia Smith   2003, 2004
 Jonathan Oxer 2005-2007
 Stewart Smith (Australian) 2008, 2009
 John Ferlito 2010-2012
 Joshua Hesketh 2013-2015
 Hugh Blemings 2016
 Kathy Reid 2017-2019
 Sae Ra Germaine 2019-2021
 Joel Addison 2022-

Previous committee members and details can be found on the Linux Australia website http://linux.org.au/About/Council

Notable former committee members include Andrew "Tridge" Tridgell (Samba), and Paul "Rusty" Russell (Linux Kernel, notably Netfilter and the 2.6 modules rewrite), and Mary Gardiner founder of the Ada Initiative.

The Rusty Wrench award 

The Rusty Wrench is an award presented annually at linux.conf.au since 2005 for service to the free software community in Australia. It is named for its first recipient, Rusty Russell.

Past recipients 
 2022 Dave Lane
 2021 Ryan Verner
 2020 Jonathan Oxer
 2019 Joshua Hesketh
 2017 Michael Davies and Michael Still (joint winners)
 2015 Steve Walsh
 2014 Andrew Tridgell
 2013 Donna Benjamin
 2012 Mary Gardiner
 2007 Kimberlee Weatherall
 2006 Pia Waugh
 2005 Rusty Russell

The Rusty Wrench award was not awarded between 2008 and 2011. It was awarded again at linux.conf.au 2012 based on nominations from the free software and open source communities.

See also 
AUUG, the Australian Unix systems User Group
Open Source Industry Australia

References

External links 
 Main Site http://www.linux.org.au/
 Linux Conference Australia http://linux.conf.au/
 Planet Linux Australia https://planet.luv.asn.au/
 Linux Australia Mirror Project http://mirror.linux.org.au

Linux user groups
Non-profit organisations based in New South Wales
Internet in Australia